Kevin G. Honan is an American state legislator who has represented the 17th Suffolk district in the Massachusetts House of Representatives since 1987. He is the House's longest continuously serving legislator. He is a resident of the Brighton neighborhood of Boston and a member of the Democratic Party.

Education
Honan graduated from Boston College with a bachelor's degree in political science and government in 1981.

Since joining the legislature in 1987, he has received a master's degree in Management Sciences from Lesley College in 1991 and a Master's of Public Administration from the John F. Kennedy School of Government in 1999.

Massachusetts State Representative

Elections
Honan was first elected in 1986, defeating Carol Wolfe, an administrator for the neighborhood Community District Advisory Council and proponent of school desegregation, and Francis Xavier Griffin.

Honan was unopposed in the general election and Democratic primary in every race from 1988 to 2018.

He faced his only other challenge in the 2020 Democratic primary. He defeated activist attorney Jordan Meehan, a democratic socialist, with 54% of the vote. He won the general election without an opponent.

Committees
As a legislator, Honan has served on various committees, including:

 Healthcare Committee, Vice Chair 1992
 Committee on Post Audit and Oversight, Vice Chair 1994
 House Ethics Committee, Chair 1995-1996
 House Ways & Means Committee
 Housing Committee, Chair 2003–2020
 Committee on Steering, Policy, and Scheduling, Chair 2021–Present

Legislation
As chairman of the Housing Committee for seventeen years, Honan oversaw significant legislation expanding affordable housing, including a $1.8 billion bond bill to increase housing production and preserve housing affordability in 2018.

Honan co-sponsored the first eviction moratorium after the COVID-19 pandemic to be passed nationwide in April 2020. The bill protected  residents from being evicted from or foreclosed on their homes during the state's COVID-19 emergency declaration.

Personal life
Representative Honan resides in Brighton with his wife Colleen and his daughter Molly.

See also
 2019–2020 Massachusetts legislature
 2021–2022 Massachusetts legislature
 Massachusetts House of Representatives' 17th Suffolk district

References

2. https://www.repkevinhonan.org/about

Living people
Democratic Party members of the Massachusetts House of Representatives
Politicians from Boston
21st-century American politicians
Year of birth missing (living people)
Harvard Kennedy School alumni
Lesley University alumni
Morrissey College of Arts & Sciences alumni